Jan Vyčítal (8 March 1942 – 1 March 2020) was a Czech country music singer and songwriter. He was founding member of Greenhorns. He also drew the cover art for many albums.

Vyčítal was born in Prague, Protectorate of Bohemia and Moravia. He died on March 1, 2020, at the age of 77.

Selected discography
 1990 Semtex
 1992 Když sme opustili Prahu
 1993 Pivní džip
 1995 Modlitba za Wimpyho a Wabiho
 1997 Zvířecí farma
 1997 Nejhezčí písničky Honzy Vyčítala (jen vzpomínky poštmistrovic kluka...)
 1999 Master serie
 1999 V baru Zlatá Praha
 2000 60 – Honza Vyčítal a Greenhorns
 2003 Honza Vyčítal a Greenhorns – Dalas!
 2006 T jako textař
 2007 To tenkrát v druhý světový...
 2007 Vracecí kocour

References

External links

 Jan Vyčítal on Greenhorns website
 

1942 births
2020 deaths
Czechoslovak male singers
20th-century Czech male singers
21st-century Czech male singers
Czech country musicians
Musicians from Prague
Czech songwriters
Male songwriters
Czech caricaturists
Album-cover and concert-poster artists